Anywhere on Earth (AoE) is a calendar designation which indicates that a period expires when the date passes everywhere on Earth. It is a practice to help specify easy to understand deadlines such as "March 16, 2004, End of Day, Anywhere on Earth (AoE)" without requiring timezone calculations or Daylight saving time adjustments.

For any given date, the latest place on Earth where it would be valid, is on Howland and Baker Islands, in the IDLW time zone (the Western Hemisphere side of the International Date Line). Therefore, the day ends AoE when it ends on Howland Island.

The convention originated in IEEE 802.16 balloting procedures. Many IEEE 802 ballot deadlines are established as the end of day using "AoE", for "Anywhere on Earth" as a designation. This means that the deadline has not passed if, anywhere on Earth, the deadline date has not yet passed.

The day's end AoE occurs at noon Coordinated Universal Time (UTC) of the following day, Howland and Baker Islands being halfway around the world from the prime meridian that is the base reference longitude for UTC. Thus, in standard notation this is:
 UTC−12:00 (daylight saving time (DST) is not applicable)

References

External links 
 IEEE 802.16 AOE Deadline Documentation — IEEE802.org
 Time zone names -  Date Line West — WorldTimeZone.com
 AoE – Anywhere on Earth (Standard Time) — TimeAndDate.com
Timezone of "AoE" for a conference submission deadline? — StackExchange.com

Calendars